Jamie Smith may refer to:

 Jamie Smith (cartoonist) (born c. 1965), Alaskan cartoonist
 Jamie Smith (cricketer) (born 2000), English cricketer
 Jamie Smith (curler) (born 2001), Canadian curler
 Jamie Smith (field hockey) (born 1965), New Zealand field hockey player
 Jamie Smith (footballer, born 1974), English footballer (Wolverhampton Wanderers, Crystal Palace and Bristol City)
 Jamie Smith (footballer, born 1980), Scottish footballer (Celtic, ADO Den Haag, Aberdeen and Colorado Rapids)
 Jamie Smith (footballer, born 1978), Scottish footballer
 Jamie Smith (footballer, born 1989), English footballer (Crystal Palace, Brighton & Hove Albion and Leyton Orient)
 Jamie Smith (footballer, born 1997), football defender for Greenville Triumph
 Jamie Smith (footballer, born 2002), Scottish footballer (Hamilton Accies)
 Jamie Smith (rugby union) (born 1988), Irish rugby union footballer of the 2010s
 Jamie xx (Jamie Smith, born 1988), member of band The xx
 Jamie Smith (politician), member of the South Dakota House of Representatives
 Jamie Renée Smith (born 1987), American actress

See also
James Smith (disambiguation)